"Bandido" ("Bandit") is a song recorded by Spanish sister duo Azúcar Moreno, written by ,  and José Luis Abel. It is best known as the  entry at the Eurovision Song Contest 1990, held in Zagreb.

Internal selection
Televisión Española (TVE), the national broadcaster of Spain, used an internal selection process to choose Azúcar Moreno, who were becoming popular by combining traditional Spanish flamenco roots with urban contemporary musical styles, in this case electronic music. "Bandido", the song chosen to go with them to Zagreb, Croatia (then Yugoslavia), was produced by Raúl Orellana, one of the most respected dance music producers in Spain. The studio recording includes the spoken intro "Ladies and gentlemen, it's showtime at the Apollo Theater. Everybody, the hardest-working man in show business", sampled from James Brown's 1963 album Live at the Apollo.

Eurovision
At Zagreb, the song was performed first on the night, preceding 's Christos Callow and Wave with "Horis Skopo". At the end of judging that evening, "Bandido" finished in fifth place with 96 points.  was the only country to award Spain with twelve points, the highest amount possible from a country. This was however a considerably better result than the last time Spain sent a flamenco influenced song to the contest: in  Remedios Amaya's "¿Quién maneja mi barca?" finished last with a total of 0 points.

The song is about a "bandit", who stole the girls' love only to leave them with nothing except pain and sadness. The sisters beg the bandit to come back, to fulfill their longing for "dark passion", hoping that his love will be as fiery as a volcano. In the chorus, the sisters repeat that the bandit, with his eyes and lies, stole "the blood and life of [their hearts]." Musically, the song is known for having one of the longest instrumental intros in Eurovision history; 45 seconds of a total of 3 minutes.

Technical difficulties
One notable aspect of the performance was due to a technical glitch, in that one of the backing tracks started in a later position than expected. The two singers started their choreographed dance before the song, realized the tape was in the wrong position, and abruptly walked offstage in a huff, leaving viewers to wonder what had happened. After the two left the stage, BBC commentator Terry Wogan remarked, "Let's hope it doesn't go on like this or we're in for a very long night, ladies and gentlemen." After two minutes, during which the arena became silent, the sisters returned and the song was then performed in its entirety without a hitch. In 2003, BBC chose "Bandido", and all the events and difficulties surrounding the performance, as one of the most memorable moments in Eurovision history.

Chart success
After the contest, "Bandido", as a single and album, propelled Azúcar Moreno to superstardom not only in Spain, but also in Europe and Latin America, where they continued to have success for the next decade.

Covers
The song was covered by:

 Turkish singer Aşkın Nur Yengi, as "Zehir Gibisin" ("You're like a poison") in her second album, Hesap Ver ("Explain"), which was released in 1991;
 Dutch singer Paul de leeuw, as "Alleen maar de zon" ("Only the Sun") on his 1992 album Van U wil ik zingen.

References

External links
Official Eurovision Song Contest site, history by year, 1990.
Detailed info and lyrics, The Diggiloo Thrush, "Bandido".
Facebook page (in Spanish)
YouTube video

Eurovision songs of Spain
Eurovision songs of 1990
Azúcar Moreno songs
1990 songs
Epic Records singles
1990 singles